Doedain District is one of 8 districts of Rivercess County, Liberia. As of 2008, the population was 13,041.

References

 

Districts of Liberia
Rivercess County